The Ministry of Defence  is charged with co-ordinating and supervising all agencies and functions of the government relating directly to national security and the Somali Armed Forces. The President of Somalia is the Supreme Commander of the Armed Forces of the country. The Ministry of Defence provides policy framework and resources to the Armed Forces to discharge their responsibility in the context of the defence of the country. The Armed Forces (including Somali Army, Somali Air Force, and Somali Navy) under the Defence Ministry are primarily responsible for ensuring the territorial integrity of the nation. The current Minister of Defence of Somalia is Hassan Mohomed Amardanbe.

History
Historically, Somali society conferred distinction upon warriors (waranle) and rewarded military acumen. All Somali males were regarded as potential soldiers, except for the occasional religious cleric (wadaado).
Somalia's many Sultanates each maintained regular troops. In the early Middle Ages, the conquest of Shewa by the Ifat Sultanate ignited a rivalry for supremacy with the Solomonic dynasty.

In 1914, the Somaliland Camel Corps was formed in British Somaliland and saw service before, during, and after the Italian invasion of the territory during World War II.

After independence, the Darawishta merged with the former British Somaliland Scouts and new recruits to form a 5,000 strong Somali National Army. The new military's first commander was Colonel Daud Abdulle Hirsi, a former officer in the British military administration's police force, the Somalia Gendarmerie. Officers were trained in the United Kingdom, Egypt and Italy. Despite the social and economic benefits that military service brought, the Somali Armed Forces began to suffer chronic manpower shortages only a few years after independence. After the 1969 Somali coup d'état, most Ministers of Defence were drawn from the Supreme Revolutionary Council until 1990-91. Major General Muhammad Ainanshe, a member of the SRC, lost his portfolio of Minister of Defence on 10 April 1971 before his arrest on 4 May 1971.

The subsequent outbreak of the Somali Civil War from the late 1980s led to the armed forces disintegrating totally.

Somalia's armed forces were gradually reconstituted after the establishment of the Transitional Federal Government (TFG) in 2004. After the creation of the Transitional Federal Government in 2010, several ministers succeeded each other. Abdihakim Mohamed Fiqi, a former Somali diplomatic with service in Washington, became Minister of Defence in mid-November 2010. While he had known that Al-Shabaab occupied the Ministry of Defence building at the time, he had not realised the weaknesses of the interim MOD premises in the privately owned Jidda Hussein building. There, the ministry had only two rooms, without internet or electricity. Thus the handshake transfer of responsibility - there was nothing more to hand over - took place in the palace, in the living room of the Somali Armed Forces commander.

Organization
 Minister of Defence
 Deputy Minister
 Secretary-General
 Under the Authority of Secretary-General
 Internal Audit and Investigation Division
 Somali Armed Forces Council Secretariat 
 Key Performance Indicator Unit
 Legal Division
 Strategic Communications Unit
 Integrity Unit
 Deputy Secretary-General (Development)
 Development Division
 Procurement Division
 Somali Armed Forces Cataloguing Authority
 Deputy Secretary-General (Policy)
 Policy and Strategic Planning Division
 Defence Industry Division
 Defence Reserve Depot
 Deputy Secretary-General (Management)
 Human Resource Management Division
 Information Management Division
 Finance Division
 Account Division
 Administration Division
 Chief of Defence Forces
 Chief of Army
 Chief of Navy
 Chief of Air Force
 Joint Force Commander
 Director of General Defence Intelligence
 Chief of Staff Somali Armed Forces Headquarters

Defence Ministers

References

External links
 Website
 Benadir Regional Administration - Transitional Federal Government of Somalia

Defense Ministry
Somalia
Military of Somalia
Somalia, Defence